Obote is a surname. Notable people with the surname include:

Milton Obote (1925–2005), former president of Uganda
Miria Obote (born 1936), Ugandan politician, widow of Milton

Surnames of African origin